Ramaria cystidiophora, commonly known as the fuzzy-footed coral, is a coral mushroom in the family Gomphaceae. It is in the Laeticolora subgenus of Ramaria. The branches are yellow, sometimes brighter at the tips, growing from a fuzzy white stem. The odour is sweet.

While the species is relatively unlikely to be confused with another, several varieties existfor instance var. anisata, which is of a peach hue.

Taxonomy
The species was first described as Clavaria cystidiophora by Calvin Henry Kauffman in 1928. E.J.H. Corner transferred it to the genus Ramaria in 1950.

References

External links

Gomphaceae
Fungi described in 1928
Fungi of North America